Korom Pulleri Vadhayarillathu Unnikrishnan Namboothiri (19 October 1923  20 January 2021) was an Indian actor in Malayalam movies. He mainly handled comedy roles and grandfather roles. His role as Dileep's grand father in the Malayalam movie Kalyanaraman was well noted. P. V. Kunhikrishnan, a judge of the Kerala High Court is his son and the noted lyricist and music director Kaithapram Damodaran Namboothiri is his son-in-law. He died on  20 January 2021 at a private hospital in Kannur.

Life and career
Unnikrishnan Namboothiri was born in a brahmin family on 19 October 1923 to Pulleri Vadhayarillathu Narayanan Namboothiri and Devaki Antharjanam at Korom, Payyanur. He had five siblings.

He had his primary education from Payyanur Boys High School. He was married to Leela Antharjanam from Thekkumpurathu Mana in Cherpulassery in Palakkad district (died in 2009) and has 2 sons, Bhavadasan and Kunhikrishnan, and 2 daughters, Devi and Yamuna. His elder daughter, Devi, is married to Malayalam music director Kaithapram Damodaran Namboothiri. He resided at Payyanur in Kannur district. His son P. V. Kunhikrishnan, is a Judge of the Kerala High Court. His grandson Deepankuran is also a music director.

He debuted with the movie Desadanam in 1996. He played an important role in the film. The film won National award for best Regional film in the year 1997. His popular movies are Kalyanaraman, Desadanam, Mayamohini, Rappakal, Loudspeaker, Photographer, Pokkiri Raja, Madhuranombarakattu, Angene Oru Avadhikkalathu, Kaikudunna Nilavu and Kaliyattam. He acted with Rajinikanth in Chandramukhi, teamed up with Kamal Haasan for Pammal K. Sambandam and worked with Ajith Kumar in Kandukondain Kandukondain.

Death
Unnikrishnan Namboothiri was diagnosed with pneumonia in January 2021. Following this, he was admitted to a private hospital in Payyanur and then at another hospital in Kannur. Later, he recovered from pneumonia but suffered fever and then got admitted again to hospital. He subsequently tested positive for COVID-19 during the COVID-19 pandemic in India and was admitted to the intensive care unit, where he died on 20 January, at age 97. He was cremated with full state honours.

Partial filmography

Malayalam
 Desadanam (1996)... Sankaran's Father
 Oral Mathram (1997)
 Kaliyattam (1997)
 Kaikudunna Nilavu (1998)
 Angene Oru Avadhikkalathu (1999)... Parameswara Warrier 
 Garshom (1999)... Bappu Haji 
 Madhuranombarakattu (2000)
 Meghamalhar (2001)
 Kalyanaraman (2002)... Gopalakrishnan
 Sadanandante Samayam (2003)
 Rappakal (2005)... Valiya Varma
 Udayon (2005)... Priest
 Note Book (2006)
 Photographer (2006)
 Loudspeaker (2009)... Muthassan 
Pokkiri Raja (2010)
Mayamohini (2012)
Vasanthathinte Kanal Vazhikalil (2014)
Mazhavillinattam Vare (2012)

Tamil
 Kandukondain Kandukondain (2000) as Chandrasekhar
 Pammal K. Sambandam (2002) as Sambandham's grandfather
 Chandramukhi (2005)

References

External links

Unnikrishnan Namboothiri at MSI

1923 births
2021 deaths
Male actors from Kerala
Male actors in Malayalam cinema
Indian male film actors
20th-century Indian male actors
21st-century Indian male actors
Male actors in Tamil cinema
Deaths from the COVID-19 pandemic in India